Fairlee is a suburb of Newport, on the Isle of Wight, on the east side of the River Medina. Fairlee Road runs through the area. During a week in June each year the main road northbound is completely closed to vehicles during the Isle of Wight Festival. Fairlee Service Station, Seaclose Stores and the Mountbatten Centre, with Medina High School are located in the area.

Newport, Isle of Wight